Mohammad Abbas Bhat  (aka Ali bhai) was the district commander Shopian of the Hizbul Mujahideen.

Death 
Bhat was killed in a firefight with Indian military forces in Batagund area of Shopian district. He was subsequently buried in Mantribugh. His death sparked clashes in the region.

References 

Jammu and Kashmir